Science, Numbers, and I is a collection of seventeen scientific essays by American writer and scientist Isaac Asimov. It was the sixth of a series of books collecting essays from The Magazine of Fantasy and Science Fiction. It was first published by Doubleday & Company in 1968.

Contents

"Balancing the Books" (F&SF, July 1966)
"BB or Not BB, That is the Question" (August 1966)
"I'm Looking Over a Four-Leaf Clover" (September 1966)
"Portrait of the Writer as a Boy" (October 1966)
"Old Man River" (November 1966)
"The Symbol-Minded Chemist" (December 1966)
"Right Beneath Your Feet" (January 1967)
"Impossible, That's All" (February 1967)
"Crowded!" (March 1967)
"A Matter of Scale" (April 1967)
"Times of Our Lives" (May 1967)
"Non-Time Travel" (June 1967)
"Twelve Point Three Six Nine" (July 1967)
"Kaleidoscope in the Sky" (August 1967)
"The Great Borning" (September 1967)
"Music to My Ears" (October 1967)
"Knock Plastic!" (November 1967)

External links
Asimovonline.com

Scientific essays
Essay collections by Isaac Asimov
1968 non-fiction books
Works originally published in The Magazine of Fantasy & Science Fiction
Doubleday (publisher) books